Jirokichi (written: 次郎吉 or 次朗吉) is a masculine Japanese given name. Notable people with the name include:

, better known as Nezumi Kozō, Japanese thief and folk hero.
, Japanese swordsman.

Japanese masculine given names